The St. George Tabernacle is a historic building in St. George, Utah. It opened in 1876 to serve as a public works building, originally hosting church services and court hearings. Today, it is open to the public and hosts many public events, such as concerts.

History

The settlement of St. George, Utah Territory was seen to be an important site for the future of the Church of Jesus Christ of Latter-day Saints. It was intended to be a cotton-growing town to allow the members of the church to be self-sufficient. The arid climate of Utah's Dixie resulted in poor harvests, resulting in economic hardship. Brigham Young, the President of the church at the time, then commissioned the construction of public works buildings in the area to assist the farmers.

The tabernacle was intended to work as a church and a courthouse. Funds for the building were raised by diverting all tithes from Beaver and all communities southward. Construction began on June 1, 1863. The building was opened on May 14, 1876, with a dedication ceremony featuring Brigham Young, Jr.

Miles Romney, a member of the Romney family, created the plans for the building. The red sandstone bricks used to construct the building were intended to match the surrounding red cliffs. A gallery was built ten feet off the ground on the north, south, and east walls, with two circular staircases serving the east end. An organ was added in 1878. All materials were local, except for windows, shipped from Wilmington, California. When completed, the church could seat 1,200 people. The clock tower was originally used by the city residents to tell time.

The tabernacle still stands and earned the nickname "jewel of the desert". It underwent restoration in 1993 to help it resemble its original state. The building is open to the public and hosts church services and local events, such as public concerts.

References

St. George Tabernacle

External links

Churches completed in 1876
19th-century Latter Day Saint church buildings
National Register of Historic Places in Washington County, Utah
Churches on the National Register of Historic Places in Utah
Buildings and structures in St. George, Utah
Tabernacles (LDS Church) in Utah
1876 establishments in Utah Territory
Historic American Buildings Survey in Utah